Fábio André Silvestre Tomas (born 25 January 1990 in Sobral de Monte Agraço) is a Portuguese former cyclist.

Major results

2008
 2nd Time trial, National Junior Road Championships
2010
 2nd Time trial, National Under-23 Road Championships
 3rd Overall Volta ao Alentejo
2011
 National Under-23 Road Championships
1st  Road race
3rd Time trial
2012
 1st  Time trial, National Under-23 Road Championships
 4th Paris–Tours Espoirs
 9th Duo Normand (with Alexandre Pliușchin)
 10th Road race, UEC European Under-23 Road Championships
2013
 1st  Overall Le Triptyque des Monts et Châteaux
1st  Points classification
 1st Stage 4 Circuit des Ardennes
 Ronde de l'Oise
1st Mountains classification
1st Stage 4
 1st Stage 1 (TTT) Czech Cycling Tour
 3rd Dorpenomloop Rucphen
 4th Overall Tour de Normandie
1st Stage 1
 7th Ronde van Noord-Holland
 10th Grand Prix Südkärnten

References

External links

1990 births
Living people
Portuguese male cyclists
European Games competitors for Portugal
Cyclists at the 2015 European Games
Sportspeople from Lisbon District